Wave model is a concept of language development in historical linguistics.

A wave model is a theoretical concept comparing a phenomenon of any type to any part of a physical wave.

Wave model can refer to:

 Wind wave model, a mathematical model of sea waves
 Density wave model, a mathematical model of a spiral galaxy
 Kinematic wave model, an explanation of traffic flow

See also
 Wave (disambiguation)